Oedothelphusa is a genus of crabs in the family Pseudothelphusidae, containing the single species Oedothelphusa orientalis.

References

Pseudothelphusidae
Monotypic arthropod genera
Invertebrates of Venezuela
Freshwater crustaceans of South America